The Robot and the Man is a 1953 anthology of science fiction short stories regarding robots edited by Martin Greenberg.  The stories originally appeared in the magazines Astounding SF and Galaxy Science Fiction.

Contents
 Foreword, by Martin Greenberg
 "The Mechanical Answer", by John D. MacDonald
 "Self Portrait", by Bernard Wolfe
 "Deadlock", by Lewis Padgett
 "Robinc", by Anthony Boucher using his H. H. Holmes pseudonym
 "Burning Bright", by Robert Moore Williams using his John S. Browning pseudonym
 "Final Command", by A. E. van Vogt
 "Though Dreamers Die", by Lester del Rey
 "Rust", by Joseph E. Kelleam
 "Robots Return", by Robert Moore Williams
 "Into Thy Hands", by Lester del Rey

Reception
P. Schuyler Miller reported that "the theme hangs together very well," with some "whittling" by the editor to make the stories seem more consistent. He noted that many of the better stories regarding robots had already been anthologized elsewhere.

References

1953 anthologies
Science fiction anthologies
Gnome Press books
Robots in literature